Thai Airways International Flight 311 was a flight from Bangkok, Thailand's Don Mueang International Airport to Kathmandu, Nepal's Tribhuvan International Airport. On Friday, 31 July 1992, an Airbus A310-304 on the route, registration  crashed on approach to Kathmandu. This was both the first hull loss and the first fatal accident involving the Airbus A310.

Aircraft and crew 
The aircraft's first flight was on 2 October 1987, and it entered service with Canadian airline Wardair under the registration C-FGWD. Wardair was acquired by Canadian Airlines International in 1989 and their operations consolidated and integrated under the Canadian Airlines banner.  This Airbus A310 formally entered service with Canadian Airlines from 15 January 1990 (with the same registration). It was shortly thereafter sold to Thai Airways International, which took delivery on 9 May 1990 and had it re-registered as HS-TID. The aircraft was powered by two General Electric CF6-80C2A2 turbofan engines.

At the time of its destruction on 31 July 1992, the aircraft had been in commercial operations for less than five years.  It was piloted by Captain Preeda Suttimai (41), and First Officer Phunthat Boonyayej (52), with a cabin crew of 12 flight attendants looking after its 99 passengers.

Accident
Flight 311 departed Bangkok at 10:30 local time. It was scheduled to arrive in Kathmandu at 12:55 Nepal Standard Time. After crossing into Nepalese airspace, the pilots contacted air traffic control (ATC) and were cleared for an instrument approach from the south called the "Sierra VOR circling approach" for Runway 20. Nepalese ATC at the time was not equipped with radar.

Before ATC could reply, the flight rescinded their previous transmission. The flight was then cleared for a straight-in Sierra approach to Runway 02 and told to report leaving . The captain asked numerous times for the winds and visibility at the airport, but ATC merely told him that Runway 02 was available.

A number of frustrating and misleading communications (due partly to language problems and partly to the inexperience of the air traffic controller, who was a trainee with only nine months on the job) ensued between ATC and the pilots regarding Flight 311's altitude and distance from the airport. The captain asked four times for permission to turn left, but after receiving no firm reply to his requests, he announced that he was turning right and climbed the aircraft to flight level 200. The flight descended back to 11,500 ft, went through a 360° turn, and passed over the airport northbound.

Seconds before impact, the ground proximity warning system (GPWS) activated, and sounded alarms warning the crew of the imminent collision with the mountains. First Officer Boonyayej warned Captain Suttimai and urged him to turn the aircraft around, but possibly due to his frustration from the communications with ATC, Suttimai erroneously stated the GPWS was just giving false reports.

Investigation

Investigators from the Civil Aviation Authority of Nepal, Airbus Industrie, and the Transportation Safety Board of Canada (which assisted with technical details) determined that the aircraft had experienced a minor fault in the workings of the inboard trailing flaps just after the aircraft reached the Sierra reporting fix. Concerned that the complex approach into Kathmandu in instrument conditions would be difficult with malfunctioning flaps and frustrated by ATC and his first officer's inconclusive and weak answers to his questions, the captain decided to divert to Calcutta. The flaps suddenly began to work properly, but the captain was forced to resolve more aspects of the difficult approach himself due to his first officer's lack of initiative. Only after numerous extremely frustrating exchanges with ATC was the captain able to obtain adequate weather information for the airport, but by that time he had overflown Kathmandu and the aircraft was headed towards the Himalayas.

Nepalese authorities found that the probable causes of the accident were the captain and air traffic controller's loss of situational awareness; language and technical problems caused the captain to experience frustration and a high workload; the first officer's lack of initiative and inconclusive answers to the captain's questions; the air traffic controller's inexperience, poor grasp of English, and reluctance to interfere with what he saw as piloting matters such as terrain separation; poor supervision of the inexperienced air traffic controller; Thai Airways International's failure to provide simulator training for the complex Kathmandu approach to its pilots; and improper use of the aircraft's flight management system.

While trekking up the Himalaya mountain to the crash site, a British investigator from Airbus, Gordon Corps (62), died due to altitude sickness. Corps had over 11,500 flight hours and was a senior test pilot for Airbus.

Victims

Aftermath
Thai Airways retired the flight number 311 after the accident, along with its counterpart flight number 312, which had been used for the outbound flight from Kathmandu to Bangkok. These were replaced by flight numbers 319 and 320, respectively.  These redesignated flights continued to be operated by Airbus A310 aircraft until this type was retired by the airline and replaced with Boeing 777 aircraft in 2001. The remains of the aircraft can still be seen in Langtang National Park on the trek from Ghopte to the Tharepati Pass.

Fifty-nine days after the Flight 311 disaster, Pakistan International Airlines Flight 268 crashed on approach to Kathmandu, killing all 167 on board, the deadliest accident in the country's history.

Dramatization 
The crash is featured in the 10th episode of the 17th season of Mayday (Air Crash Investigation). The episode is titled "The Lost Plane".

See also 

 Aviation safety
 Controlled flight into terrain
 List of accidents and incidents involving commercial aircraft
 China General Aviation Flight 7552 Another aviation accident that occurred on the same day
 Mandala Airlines Flight 660 Another Aviation Accident that occurred a week before Flight 311, also crashing into a mountain
 List of airplane accidents in Nepal

References

External links 
 
 Google Books description: "Thai Airways International Ltd. Airbus Industrie A310-304, HS-TID, Near Kathmandu, Nepal, 23NM NNE, 31 July 1992." Commission for the Accident Investigation of TG311, 1993.
 
 Pre-crash photos of HS-TID from Airliners.net

Aviation accidents and incidents in 1992
Airliner accidents and incidents caused by pilot error
Airliner accidents and incidents involving controlled flight into terrain
Aviation accidents and incidents in Nepal
311
Accidents and incidents involving the Airbus A310
1992 in Nepal 
July 1992 events in Asia
Aviation accidents and incidents caused by air traffic controller error
History of Nepal (1951–2008)